The term Hare method, named after Sir Thomas Hare, may refer to either of two related voting systems: 

Instant-runoff voting for single seat elections
Hare quota for electing multi-seat constituencies